Reverend William James Leggett (October 12, 1848 – October 28, 1925) was an American college football player who was the team captain of Rutgers in the first college football game.

William Leggett was born on October 12, 1848 in Ghent, New York. He went to high school at Claverack and attended college at Rutgers University as well as New Brunswick Theological Seminary. In 1869, he organized a football team of Rutgers classmates to play against Princeton University. He was named captain by his teammates. Shortly before the game started, Leggett and William S. Gummere, the Princeton captain, developed the rules of play. Under the guidance of Leggett, Rutgers won the first game in football history 6 to 4. In the second game, Rutgers would lose to Princeton 0 to 8. He graduated from Rutgers 1872. In 1875, Leggett became a pastor, which was his occupation until 1917. After 1917 he became the vice president of the Dutch Reformed Church where he would serve until his death in 1925. Leggett died on October 28, 1925 in Nyack, New York from a stroke. He was 77 at the time of his death. He was inducted into the Rutgers Athletics Hall of Fame in 1989.

References

External links

1848 births
1925 deaths
19th-century players of American football
Rutgers Scarlet Knights football players
Players of American football from New York (state)